Adolphe Schaeffer-Stel, known in the theatre under the name Adolphe Stel was a 19th-century French playwright.

A theater critic, his plays were presented among others, at the Théâtre des Délassements-Comiques, the Théâtre du Luxembourg and the Théâtre Beaumarchais.

Works 
1847: Une Lettre anonyme, one-act comédie en vaudeville
1861: La Chasse à ma femme, one-act vaudeville, with Adolphe Favre
1864: Les Métamorphoses de Bougival, one-act vaudeville, with Favre
1866: Un Monsieur qui a perdu son mouchoir, one-act comédie en vaudeville, with Favre
1867: L'Enlèvement au bouquet, one-act comédie en vaudeville

External links 
Adolphe Stel on WorldCat

19th-century French dramatists and playwrights
Year of birth missing
Year of death missing